Steingut is a German surname, it means stoneware. Notable people with the surname include: 

Irwin Steingut (1893–1952), American lawyer, businessman and politician
Stanley Steingut (1920–1989), American politician, son of Irwin

German-language surnames